Sthenias is a genus of longhorn beetles of the subfamily Lamiinae, containing the following species:

subgenus Albosthenias
 Sthenias albicollis Gahan, 1890
 Sthenias leucothorax Breuning, 1938
 Sthenias microphthalmus Breuning, 1956

subgenus Sthenias
 Sthenias angustatus Pic, 1925
 Sthenias borneanus Breuning, 1982
 Sthenias burmanensis Breuning, 1938
 Sthenias cylindrator (Fabricius, 1801)
 Sthenias cylindricus Gressitt, 1939
 Sthenias damarensis Adlbauer, 2011
 Sthenias franciscanus J. Thomson, 1865
 Sthenias gahani (Pic, 1912)
 Sthenias gracilicornis Gressitt, 1937
 Sthenias gracilis Breuning, 1938
 Sthenias grisator (Fabricius, 1787)
 Sthenias javanicus Breuning, 1940
 Sthenias longeantennatus Breuning, 1938
 Sthenias maculiceps Gahan, 1890
 Sthenias madurae Boppe, 1914
 Sthenias partealbicollis Breuning, 1968
 Sthenias pascoei Ritsema, 1888
 Sthenias persimilis Breuning, 1938
 Sthenias pictus Breuning, 1938
 Sthenias poleti Le Moult, 1938
 Sthenias pseudodorsalis Breuning, 1938
 Sthenias pseudodorsaloides Breuning, 1968
 Sthenias puncticornis Fairmaire, 1891
 Sthenias tonkineus Pic, 1925
 Sthenias varius (Olivier, 1792)
 Sthenias yunnanus Breuning, 1938

References

 
Pteropliini